Encore at Monroe is a gated community and census-designated place (CDP) in Monroe Township, Middlesex County, New Jersey, United States. It is in the western part of the township, bordered to the south by Clearbrook.

The community was first listed as a CDP prior to the 2020 census.

Demographics

References 

Census-designated places in Middlesex County, New Jersey
Census-designated places in New Jersey
Monroe Township, Middlesex County, New Jersey